Starosenyutkin is a rural locality (a khutor) in Proninskoye Rural Settlement, Serafimovichsky District, Volgograd Oblast, Russia. The population was 82 as of 2010. There are 6 streets.

Geography 
Starosenyutkin is located 184 km southwest of Serafimovich (the district's administrative centre) by road. Yagodny is the nearest rural locality.

References 

Rural localities in Serafimovichsky District